Owen Napier Denbigh Phillips (born 9 July 1906, date of death unknown) was a Belizean sports shooter. He competed at the 1972 Summer Olympics and the 1976 Summer Olympics. At the 1972 Olympics, he competed in mixed 50 metre free pistol and mixed 50 metre rifle, prone. At the 1976 Olympics, he competed in mixed 50 metre rifle, prone.

References

External links
 

1906 births
Year of death missing
Belizean male sport shooters
Olympic shooters of British Honduras
Olympic shooters of Belize
Shooters at the 1972 Summer Olympics
Shooters at the 1976 Summer Olympics
Place of birth missing